Chen Zi'ang (661 (or 656)–702), courtesy name Boyu, was a Chinese poet of the Tang dynasty. He was important in helping to bring into being the type of poetry which is considered to be characteristically "Tang". Dissatisfied with the current state of the affairs of poetry at the time, almost paradoxically, by keeping his eye on the remote antiquity he helped usher in a new age of Chinese poetry (see quote below). He would soon be followed by such poets of the golden age of Tang poetry as Wang Wei, Li Bai, and Du Fu.

Biography
A native of Shehong County in modern Sichuan province, Chen Zi'ang was the son of a rich man, and did not travel to the capital to take his exams until he was in his twenties.
He completed the Jinshi level of the Imperial Examination at age twenty-four.

Having arrived in the capital metropolis, Chen suddenly called attention to his poetry, by expensive and elaborate means: startling the spectators in the marketplace, he paid the asking price of a million cash for a Tartar musical instrument. Responding to the onlookers consequent intense curiosity, he claimed to be an expert at playing that particular musical instrument, and invited everyone to see him do a performance the next day. Then, when the curious crowds showed up, he had prepared a lavish feast. However rather than performing any music, he got up, and introducing himself as a writer of essays and a poet, he preceded to smash to bits the musical instrument for which he had paid so much, and handed out copies of his works, including his Thirty-Eight Lyrics.

As an important advisor to the Empress Wu Zetian, Chen was a firm advocate of poetry reflecting real life, and thus with his active interest in politics, much of his work has undertones of social commentary. Some have suggested that it was his work that was the reason he suffered persecution at the hands of Wu Sansi; he died in 702 having been in and out of prison.

Poetry and Works
This quote, from Chen to a friend, shows his attitude as a formative poet of the Early Period of Tang poetry:<blockquote>The art of letters has been declining for five hundred years....In my leisure hours, I have looked into the poems of the Ch'i and Liang Dynasties, and I could not help sighing when I found all genuine feeling and insight were smothered by meaningless figures of speech and squeamish refinement of words. So much rhetoric and so little sentiment! When will the grand tradition of Shih Ching revive?

Chen Zi'ang is well known for his collection of thirty-eight poems "Ganyu", written in a simpler  vocabulary than typified the poetry of that time and which were heavily influenced by Daoism. He has one poem in the Three Hundred Tang Poems, translated by Witter Bynner as "On a Gate-tower at Yuzhou"

Notes

References
 Wu, John C. H. (1972). The Four Seasons of Tang Poetry. Rutland, Vermont: Charles E. Tuttle. 
 Zhu Xiaoyin, The Reason for Chen Zi'ang's Death (关于陈子昂的死因) 1983

Three Hundred Tang Poems poets
Tang dynasty politicians from Sichuan
661 births
702 deaths
Politicians from Suining
Poets from Sichuan
7th-century Chinese poets
8th-century Chinese poets
Writers from Suining